Amanda Zuva Habane is a South Africa based Zimbabwean socialite and businesswoman who was nominated as the Business woman of the year for the African Women of Essence Awards 2019.

Background
Born on 21 September 1986 in Seke, Zuva grew up in Gweru where in 2003 she was crowned Miss Gweru. In 2019 she revealed her abusive past, which she indicated as her inspiration to help other women who might be facing similar situations.

She is married to Prince Habane and they have two children.

References

Living people
1986 births
South African socialites
Zimbabwean models
People from Gweru